Policy Innovations was an online magazine devoted to news and analysis examining local solutions to global challenges facing today's interconnected world. It covered the future of cities, education, environment, food, health, gender, and technology. Policy Innovations was a global conversation about new ways of thinking. It also invited commentary on NGOs, social enterprises, companies and entrepreneurs such as Nobel Prize-winner Muhammad Yunus, who are driving change.

Policy Innovations was a nonprofit media venture housed at the Carnegie Council for Ethics in International Affairs in New York City. The project began in 2004 with funding from the Rockefeller Brothers Fund, and the magazine component launched on September 6, 2006.

Madeleine Lynn was the managing editor. The magazine closed in May 2016.

Contributors and Advisors
David Abshire
Philip Auerswald
Harriet Babbit
Steve Clemons
Jean-Marc Coicaud
Jayati Ghosh
Nikolas Gvosdev
Sasha Issenberg
Jomo K.S.
Sherman Katz
Rebecca MacKinnon
Neela Marikkar
Moisés Naím
Thomas Pogge
Iqbal Quadir
Mary Robinson
Jeffrey Sachs
Peter Singer
Jerry Sternin
Joseph Stiglitz

References

External links
 Policy Innovations
About

2006 establishments in New York (state)
2016 disestablishments in New York (state)
Defunct political magazines published in the United States
Online magazines published in the United States
Defunct magazines published in the United States
Magazines established in 2006
Magazines disestablished in 2016
Magazines published in New York City
Serials about globalization